A list of films released in Japan in 1957 (see 1957 in film).

See also
1958 in Japan

References

Footnotes

Sources

External links
Japanese films of 1957 at the Internet Movie Database

1957
Lists of 1957 films by country or language
Films